Munya may refer to:

Munya language, a language spoken in China
Munya, Ghana, a community in Tolon District in the Northern Region
Munya, Nigeria

People
 Munya Chidzonga (born 1986), Zimbabwean actor, filmmaker and entrepreneur
 Munya Chawawa (born 1992), British-Zimbabwean actor and comedian

See also
 Munyaradzi